Silvercreek Township is one of the twelve townships of Greene County, Ohio, United States. As of the 2010 census, the population was 3,738, of whom 1,745 lived in the unincorporated portion of the township.

Geography
Located in the eastern part of the county, it borders the following townships:
Ross Township - north
Jefferson Township, Fayette County - east
Jasper Township, Fayette County - southeast
Jefferson Township - south
Caesarscreek Township - southwest
New Jasper Township - west

Most of the village of Jamestown is located in northwestern Silvercreek Township, and part of the census-designated place of Shawnee Hills is located in the township's west.

Name and history
Silvercreek Township was established in 1811.

It is the only Silvercreek Township statewide.

Government
The township is governed by a three-member board of trustees, who are elected in November of odd-numbered years to a four-year term beginning on the following January 1. Two are elected in the year after the presidential election and one is elected in the year before it. There is also an elected township fiscal officer, who serves a four-year term beginning on April 1 of the year after the election, which is held in November of the year before the presidential election. Vacancies in the fiscal officership or on the board of trustees are filled by the remaining trustees.

References

External links
County website

Townships in Greene County, Ohio
Townships in Ohio
1811 establishments in Ohio
Populated places established in 1811